Marion High School is a historic school building located at Marion, Marion County, South Carolina.  It was built in 1923–1924, and is a one-story, Classical Revival style brick building. The building's main façade features baroque massing with projecting central and end pavilions. When built, the school included a gymnasium, a physics and chemistry laboratory, a domestic science department with sewing and cooking rooms, agriculture laboratory, and a commercial department. The building served as a high school until 1975, then became the home for Marion Elementary School until 1994.  The building now serves as the headquarters for the Marion County School District.

It was listed in the National Register of Historic Places in 2001.

References

School buildings on the National Register of Historic Places in South Carolina
Neoclassical architecture in South Carolina
School buildings completed in 1924
Buildings and structures in Marion County, South Carolina
National Register of Historic Places in Marion County, South Carolina
1924 establishments in South Carolina